Prayers for Bobby is a televised drama film that premiered on the Lifetime network on January 24, 2009. The film is based on the book of the same name by Leroy F. Aarons, which is itself based on the true story of the life and legacy of Bobby Griffith, a gay teen who killed himself in 1983 due to his mother's homophobia. Ryan Kelley stars as Bobby Griffith and Sigourney Weaver portrays his mother Mary.

The film was watched by more than 6 million viewers during its two-day initial run. It received positive reviews from critics and was nominated for two Primetime Emmy Awards: Outstanding Television Movie and Outstanding Lead Actress in a Limited Series or Movie for Weaver, who was also nominated for a Golden Globe Award, and a Screen Actors Guild Award.

Plot
Mary Griffith is a devout Christian who raises her four children—Ed, Bobby, Joy and Nancy—according to the evangelical teachings of her local Presbyterian church in the late 1970s and early 1980s in Walnut Creek, California.

Ed finds Bobby resisting temptations to overdose on Aspirin as an initial suicide attempt before Bobby confides to him that he is gay. Life changes for the entire family after Mary learns about his secret. In hopes of converting him, she takes him to a psychiatrist, who explains to Bobby's parents that a person's homosexuality is the result of lacking a close relationship with their parents. She then advises Bobby to pray harder and seek solace in Church activities, as well as to arrange a special bonding time with his father. While spending such quality time with his father, Bobby explains his desire to become a writer, to which his father suggests "some dreams are just not realistic."

Bobby's father and siblings slowly come to terms with his homosexuality, but Mary believes God can cure him. To get away from his family, Bobby visits his cousin Jeanette in Portland, Oregon; she has always been accepting of his sexual orientation and tries to help him realize that his mother will never change. Desperate for his mother's approval, he does what is asked of him, but through it all, the Church's disapproval of homosexuality and his mother's attempts to suppress his growing behaviors in public cause him to grow increasingly withdrawn and depressed.

Stricken with guilt, Bobby finds a boyfriend, David, at a gay bar. Nonetheless, before leaving the house with David, Mary informs Bobby that she "will not have a gay son." After Bobby finds David betraying him for another man, he continues to think of his mother's words of prejudice, i.e., when saying "homosexuality is a sin and (gays) are doomed to spend eternity in hell," as well as calling him "sick," "perverted," and "a danger to our children." Following his subsequent depression and self-loathing which intensifies, one night he free falls off of a bridge onto a highway and into the path of an oncoming eighteen-wheeler truck, which kills him instantly. The family receives the news the following day and are devastated.

Faced with their tragedy, Mary begins to question herself and her Church's interpretation of the Scripture. Through her long and emotional journey, Mary slowly reaches out to the gay community and discovers unexpected support from them. She becomes acquainted with a local reverend of the Metropolitan Community Church, who convinces her to attend a meeting of Parents, Families and Friends of Lesbians and Gays (PFLAG). It is there that she recalls Bobby being different from conception and reassures herself that his true value was in his heart.

Mary then gives a speech in a Walnut Creek city council meeting supporting a local "gay day" live on television. She tells of her experiences with Bobby, the struggles she had coping with him coming out of the closet and her stubbornness to reevaluate her religious beliefs which were nothing more than "bigotry" and "dehumanizing slander." Mary also acknowledges how she came to realize that Bobby's sexual orientation was quite natural in God's image and his suicide was subsequently due to poor parenting. She concludes her speech by urging people to think before they say, voice, or support homophobia because "a child is listening." The measure is rejected, but Mary and her family travel to San Francisco with fellow PFLAG members and walk in a gay pride parade, during which she sees another young man just like Bobby observing the parade. She walks over and hugs him, finally coming to terms with her son's death and vowing to work hard for the rights of gays and lesbians.

Cast
 Sigourney Weaver as Mary Griffith
 Henry Czerny as Robert Griffith
Ryan Kelley as Bobby Griffith
 Austin Nichols as Ed Griffith
 Dan Butler as the Rev. Whitsell
 Carly Schroeder as Joy Griffith
 Shannon Eagen as Nancy Griffith 
 Scott Bailey as David
 Bryan Endress-Fox as Greg
 Rebecca Louise Miller as Jeanette
 Marshall McClean as Reverend Owens
 Mary Griffith as herself in the Pride Parade scene

Production
Executive producers David Permut, Daniel Sladek, and Chris Taaffe initiated and championed the project over a period of thirteen years. The film was directed by Russell Mulcahy. Screenwriter Katie Ford based the teleplay on the noted best-selling book Prayers for Bobby: A Mother's Coming to Terms with the Suicide of Her Gay Son by Leroy F. Aarons, a journalist who interviewed Mary Griffith about her experiences that led to the suicide of her son as well as her work advocating the rights of the Lesbian, Gay, Bisexual, and Transgender community. Griffith and Aarons are credited as co-producers on the film. Produced by Once Upon A Times Films, Ltd in association with Permut Presentations and Sladek Taaffe Productions, the other executive producer was Stanley M. Brooks. The final scene of the film features "Here I Am" by Leona Lewis.

Reception

Ratings
Prayers For Bobby received 3.8 million total viewers during the film's January 24, 2009 premiere on Lifetime, with 2.3 million total viewers subsequently during the January 25, 2009 airdate with a combined total of 6.1 million viewers.

Critical reaction
Critics responded positively to the film, which received approval from 73% of 15 critics and an average rating of 6.4/10 on the review aggregator Rotten Tomatoes. Critics' consensus on the website is "A devastating true story and terrific performance by Sigourney Weaver give Prayers for Bobby palpable power, although some viewers may find this well-intentioned film too calculating in its efforts to wring tears." Brian Lowry of Variety wrote "Sigourney Weaver's TV movie debut proves worth the wait, as Lifetime's fact-based Prayers for Bobby revisits ground similar to that broken nearly 25 years ago by the AIDS-themed "An Early Frost" and – thanks to enduring religious-based bigotry toward gays – still feels fresh and poignant."

Accolades
Sigourney Weaver was given the Trevor Life Award from The Trevor Project for her participation in the film. The award was presented by Anne Hathaway. In 2015, executive producers Daniel Sladek & Chris Taaffe were invited by the Vice President of the EU to the European Parliament in Brussels where they presented Prayers for Bobby to Members of Parliament on International Homophobia Day.

Home media
On December 7, 2010, Prayers for Bobby was released on DVD.

See also
 The Matthew Shepard Story

References

External links

 
 

2009 biographical drama films
2009 LGBT-related films
2009 in American television
2009 television films
2009 films
American biographical drama films
American LGBT-related films
Biographical television films
Drama films based on actual events
American drama television films
2000s English-language films
Films about suicide
Films based on biographies
Films directed by Russell Mulcahy
Films set in the 1970s
Films set in California
Films shot in Detroit
Gay-related films
LGBT-related drama films
Films about LGBT and Christianity
LGBT-related films based on actual events
Lifetime (TV network) films
Sexual orientation change efforts
2009 drama films
Biographical films about LGBT people
2000s American films